Marcel De Mulder (29 March 1928 – 18 May 2011) was a Belgian racing cyclist. He finished 21st in the 1949 Tour de France. He finished in seventh place in the 1954 Paris–Roubaix.

References

External links

1928 births
2011 deaths
Belgian male cyclists
Cyclists from East Flanders
People from Kruisem